The 1974–75 Kansas City Scouts season was the first season for the franchise. The NHL completed its first 8-year expansion cycle by adding franchises in Washington and Kansas City. Kansas City was awarded an NHL franchise on June 8, 1972. The city had a hockey history but had been a home to minor league hockey teams only. Initially, the franchise chose MO-hawks as their nickname to reflect a Missouri-Kansas union, an attempt to appeal to both Kansas and Missouri residents (the Kansas City metropolitan area spills across both states) and incorporating Missouri's postal abbreviation with the Kansas Jayhawker nickname, but the name was vetoed by the Chicago Black Hawks. Therefore, the franchise selected its 2nd choice, Scouts. This was named after the famous statue overlooking the city.

The arrival of the Scouts and Capitals led the NHL into creating 4 divisions, the Adams, Norris, Patrick and Smythe Divisions. The Scouts would be placed in the Smythe Division while their expansion cousins, the Capitals, would be in the Norris Division. The Scouts played for the first time on October 9 in Toronto. With construction of Kemper Arena (the Scouts home arena) starting late, then delayed by union work stoppages, the Scouts were forced to play their first 8 games on the road losing 7 and tying 1. On November 2, the Scouts made their home debut losing 4–3 to the Black Hawks. The following day they would get their first win beating the Capitals in Washington 5–4. The highlight of the seasons would come on January 23 when the Scouts upset the Bruins 3–2 in Boston. Despite being led in scoring by team captain Simon Nolet, the Scouts finished in last place with a 15–54–11 record.

Kansas City's games aired on radio station WDAF-AM with Dick Carlson the play-by-play broadcaster. A limited number of road contests were televised by KBMA Channel 41. Gene Osborn handled play-by-play with Bill Grigsby serving as analyst.

Offseason

NHL draft

Expansion draft

Regular season

Along with the Washington Capitals, the Scouts joined the NHL as an expansion team for the 1974–75 season. With a combined 30 teams between the NHL and the rival World Hockey Association, the talent pool available to stock the new teams was extremely thin. In their first season, the Capitals would set an NHL record for futility, losing 67 of 80 games, and only winning one on the road. The Scouts fared only marginally better, and the expansion was widely seen as having been a mistake.

They played their home games at Kemper Arena.  The team was not a particular success either at the gate or on the ice.  Rising oil prices and a falling commodity market made for hard going in the Midwest during the 1970s.
 October 9, 1974 – The Scouts played their first game in franchise history against the Toronto Maple Leafs. The final score was 6–2 in favor of the Maple Leafs.
 November 2, 1974 – The first home game in Kansas City Scouts history was played. The opponent was the Chicago Blackhawks and the Blackhawks won the game by a score of 5–4.
 November 3, 1974 – The Scouts won their first game in franchise history by defeating their expansion brethren, the Washington Capitals by a 5–4 score.
 November 13, 1974 – The Scouts won their first home game in franchise history. The final score was 5–3 in a triumph over their cross-state rivals, the St. Louis Blues.
 December 9, 1974 - Prior to a morning practice, the team was informed that head athletic trainer Gordon Marchant had committed suicide at his farm near Plattsburg, Mo. north of Kansas City. Clinton County (Mo.) Sheriff Ray Boyd stated Marchant died of a self-inflicted gunshot to the head. Marchant's body was discovered by Scouts equipment manager James Kraus. (Icing on the Plains: The Rough Ride of Kansas City's NHL Scouts, Pgs. 100-102, Troy Treasure, Balboa Press)
 January 23, 1975 – The Scouts had their biggest win of the season by defeating the Boston Bruins by a score of 3–2 in Boston. Gary Croteau's second-period goal turned out to be the game-winner. Following the game, a Boston fan attempted to attack Croteau at the Scouts' bench, but Boston police intervened. (Icing On The Plains: The Rough Ride of Kansas City's NHL Scouts, Pg. 122)

Final standings

Game log

Player stats

Forwards
Note: GP = Games played; G = Goals; A = Assists; Pts = Points; PIM = Penalty minutes

Defencemen
Note: GP = Games played; G = Goals; A = Assists; Pts = Points; PIM = Penalty minutes

Goaltending
Note: GP = Games played; W = Wins; L = Losses; T = Ties; SO = Shutouts; GAA = Goals against average

Transactions

Trades

References
 Scouts on Hockey Database
 Scouts on Database Hockey
 Scouts Game Log on Database Hockey
 1974–1975 Scouts Transactions (Archived 2009-05-27)
 

Kansas City Scouts seasons
Kansas
Kansas
1974 in Missouri
1975 in Missouri